A cane knife is a large hand-wielded cutting tool similar to a machete. Its use is prevalent in the harvesting of sugarcane in dominant cane-growing countries such as Peru, Brazil, Colombia, Australia, South Africa, Ecuador, Cuba, Jamaica, the Philippines and parts of the United States, especially Louisiana and Florida, as well as Hawaii. It is the primary tool used in countries that do not employ mechanical means for harvesting cane.

In the Philippines, particularly in Negros Island, itinerant sugarcane cutters called sacadas employ this blade, which they call an espading. The term is borrowed from the Spanish word espada, meaning "sword", while in Tagalog it is called palang. In the South Pacific, the metal hook of the cane knife was melded with the indigenous serrated warclub, resulting in the hook-bladed weapon used in modern Samoan fire knife dancing.

Design
A typical cane knife is characterized by a hardwood handle, a full tang, a deep blade and a hook at its tip used for picking up the cut cane, although some types do not employ this feature. The thin blade facilitates cutting cane quickly as the harvester slashes the cane at an angle: a thin blade slices through better than a thick blade.

Gallery

See also
 Kukri
 Golok
 Bolo knife

References

Filipino swords
Machetes
History of sugar